The 2023 Allsvenskan will be the 99th season since its establishment in 1924 of Sweden's top-level football league, Allsvenskan. A total of 16 teams will participate. BK Häcken are the defending champions after winning the title in the previous season. IF Brommapojkarna and Halmstads BK are promoted after finishing first and second in 2022 Superettan, while Varbergs BoIS staved off relegation by defeating third placed Östers IF.

The 2023 Allsvenskan season will begin on April 1, and will end in November 2023 (not including play-off matches).

Teams

A total of sixteen teams are contesting the league, including fourteen sides from the previous season, and two promoted teams from the 2022 Superettan.

Stadiums and locations

Personnel and kits
All teams are obligated to have the logo of the league sponsor Unibet as well as the Allsvenskan logo on the right sleeve of their shirt.

Note: Flags indicate national team as has been defined under FIFA eligibility rules. Players and Managers may hold more than one non-FIFA nationality.

Managerial changes

League table

Positions by round

Results by round

Results

Relegation play-offs
The 14th-placed team of Allsvenskan will meet the third-placed team from 2023 Superettan in a two-legged tie on a home-and-away basis with the team from Allsvenskan finishing at home.

Season statistics

Top scorers

Top assists

Hat-tricks

Discipline

Player
 Most yellow cards:

 Most red cards:

Club
 Most yellow cards:

 Most red cards:

See also

Competitions
 2023 Superettan
 2023 Division 1
 2022–23 Svenska Cupen
 2023–24 Svenska Cupen

Team seasons

References

External links
 

2023
1
Sweden
Sweden
Scheduled association football competitions